Cold War 2 is a 2016 Hong Kong-Chinese crime thriller film written and directed by Longman Leung and Sunny Luk. The film is a sequel to the 2012 box office hit, Cold War, and stars returning cast members Aaron Kwok, Tony Leung, Charlie Young, Eddie Peng, Aarif Rahman and Ma Yili, joined by new cast members Chow Yun-fat, Janice Man, Tony Yang and Bibi Zhou. Cold War 2 was released on 8 July 2016 in 2D, 3D and IMAX 3D.

Plot

The Hong Kong Police Force holds a funeral for two Senior Assistant Commissioners killed during the previous film. Shortly after, Commissioner Sean Lau (Aaron Kwok) receives a call from one of the culprits behind the theft of the police van. He is told that his wife has been kidnapped and that he must release Joe Lee (Eddie Peng) for her to survive. Lau overrides standard procedure to transfer Joe out of prison, and is told by the kidnapper to bring Joe to the metro station. There, Joe is able to escape with the aid of several accomplices, one of whom sets off a bomb. The culprits leave Lau's wife alive at the station.

Lau's actions are criticized by the media and by numerous politicians, leading to a public inquiry. Fearing that the police have been infiltrated, Lau privately requests Billy Cheung (Aarif Rahman), an ICAC Principal Investigator who assisted him in the previous movie, to form a separate squad independent of the police, so they can track down the culprits. Meanwhile, MB Lee (Tony Leung), a deputy police commissioner who is about to retire, is confronted by his fugitive son along with Peter Choi (Chang Kuo-chu), a former police commissioner and MB Lee's mentor who is now manipulating politics behind the scenes. Choi is revealed as the mastermind behind the troubles of the previous film, and his current goal is to remove Lau, who is not a member of his ring, and to place his own followers into positions of power during the next election. Choi has formed a militant band consisting of former police officers who were expelled or faked their own deaths. He promises Lee not only the position of commissioner, but also of security secretary later on, upon which Lee gives into temptation and help his son.

A legislator named Oswald Kan (Chow Yun-fat) is convinced by his old friend and junior Edward Lai (Waise Lee), the current secretary of justice, to participate in the public inquiry into Lau, but is taken aback when Lee openly criticizes Lau, rather than defending him, which he was supposed to do initially . Kan deduces that Lee is being controlled, and tells his pupils to investigate, one of whom, Bella Au (Janice Man), decides to secretly follow Lee, and later Choi whom Lee confers with. Realizing that they are being followed, Choi orders a subordinate to crash into Au's car, causing a chain collision in which Au is killed, and Choi's car is trapped. Lau arrives to investigate, and a shoot-out occurs, in which Joe is shot and severely injured by Lau, but Choi escapes. Lee chastises Lau for failing to keep his promise of Joe's safety and almost get into a fight before Kan interferes. Afterwards, Kan finds a photograph taken by Au of Choi and Lee together.

Lau's independent squad finds the location of Choi's remaining henchmen and the stolen police van. Lee, meanwhile, convinces and bribes several senior police officers to sign a petition for Lau's removal, to which some comply. In the final hours before Lau steps down, he launches a raid on the henchmen, and requests that Lee take command, noting that the henchmen were former renegade police officers who previously worked under Lee would best know their strategies. Lee accepts, knowing that he cannot refuse without looking weak. The operation is a success, with all suspects killed. However, with Choi's henchmen dead, this taxes Lee emotionally, due to his close friendships. Kan and Lau report Lee's and Choi's crimes to the chief executive, who decides to grant pardon to both men since they are too important to arrest without destabilizing society. Lee is forced into retirement, and Choi is permanently exiled from Hong Kong, with their exact crimes not disclosed to the public. Lau retains his office as commissioner, and Lee visits his son, unconscious and in custody at a hospital bed.

Elsewhere, Lai continues his campaign to be elected as the future Chief Executive of Hong Kong, hoping to control the government's politics, leaving more mysteries unsolved.

Cast
Aaron Kwok as Sean Lau (劉傑輝), Commissioner of Police
Tony Leung Ka-fai as M.B. Lee (李文彬), retired Deputy Commissioner of Police (Operations)
Chow Yun-fat as Oswald Kan (簡奧偉), Ex-judge, Court of First Instance of High Court / Senior Counsel / Legislator
Charlie Young as Phoenix Leung (梁紫薇), Senior Assistant Commissioner of Police, Director of Management Services
Janice Man as Isabel Au (歐詠恩), Barrister & mentee of Oswald Kan
Eddie Peng as Joe Lee (李家俊), Ex-police constable / criminal & son of M.B. Lee
Aarif Rahman as Billy Cheung (張國標), ICAC Principal Investigator
Tony Yang as Roy Ho, Ex-Senior Police Constable
Chang Kuo-chu as Peter Choi (蔡元祺), former Commissioner of Police (Cantonese dub: Kwok Fung)
Wu Yue as Wu Tin-man, Ex-Senior Inspector of Police
Fan Zhibo as Rachel Ma, S.I.P. (VIP Protection Unit)
Ma Yili as Michelle Lau (陳雪兒), wife of Sean Lau
Bibi Zhou as Alice Poon, Barrister
Alex Tsui as Matthew Mak (麥啟文), ICAC Head of Operations
Frankie Lam as Alan Au, current Deputy Commissioner of Police (Management)
Kenny Wong as Stephen Han, current Deputy Commissioner of Police (Operations)
Ram Chiang as David Mok, Senior Assistant Commissioner of Police, Director of Crime & Security
Waise Lee as Edward Lai (黎永廉), Secretary of Justice
King Kong Lam as Gary Fu, Ex-Senior Inspector of Police
Lam Wai as Neo Chan, Ex-Senior Inspector of Police
Wong Man-piu as Eric Ma, Ex-Senior Inspector of Police
Wong Chak-fung as Mark Cheng, Ex-Senior Inspector of Police
Felix Lok as C.Y. Ma, Member of the Legislative Council / Chairman of Security Panel
Terence Yin as To Man, Chief Superintendent, Director of Information Technology
Jeannie Chan as Nicole Chan, ICAC Assistant Investigator
Kathy Yuen as Cecilia Lai, Probationary Inspector of Police and secretary to Commissioner
Dexter Young as Senior Inspector of Police, Technology Crime Division
Queenie Chu as Amber Tsui, co-conspirator
Leila Tong as Karen Tang, hostage

Production
Due to the critical and commercial success Cold War, a sequel was first announced in February 2013, where Chow Yun-fat was reported to join the sequel as the film's main antagonist. At that time, co-director Sunny Luk also confirmed that the script for Cold War 2 was being written and was due to start production by the end of 2013. Production for Cold War 2 began in September 2015 and wrapped in December of the same year.  The film was released on 8 July 2016.

Reception
Cold War 2 has grossed  worldwide.

In Hong Kong, the film has grossed a total of HK$66,244,171, breaking the record as the highest-grossing domestic film in Hong Kong, and was also the third highest-grossing film of 2016 in the territory.

Awards and nominations

References

External links

《寒戰 2》首支預告．2016 年 7 月強勢回歸 (Cold War 2 - Teaser)

2016 films
2016 crime thriller films
Hong Kong crime thriller films
Police detective films
Hong Kong sequel films
2010s Cantonese-language films
Films set in Hong Kong
Films shot in Hong Kong
IMAX films
Hong Kong 3D films
2016 3D films
China Film Group Corporation films
Chinese crime thriller films
Chinese sequel films
Chinese 3D films
Films directed by Longman Leung
Films directed by Sunny Luk
2010s Hong Kong films